Geophilus electricus is a species of soil centipede in the family Geophilidae found across temperate Europe, especially Britain and Ireland. Originally discovered and named Scolopendra electrica in 1758, it was later moved to its own genus, Geophilus. As the first species described in this genus, it is considered by some to be the type species (along with Geophilus carpophagus). It is yellowish-orange in color and can grow up to 45 millimeters, with 55 to 75 leg pairs (more than other similar Geophilus species), a distinct carpophagus fossae on the anterior sternites, and a distinctive arrangement of the coxal pores of the last leg pair. Like many geophilomorphans, G. electricus has been known to glow in the dark, most likely as a defensive maneuver.

Etymology
The name comes from Latin 'electricus', meaning 'electric', most likely referring to its ability to glow in the dark.

Habitat
G. electricus is found at altitudes below 400ft, and is partially a soil-dwelling species, living within 10cm below the ground or in the layer of leaf litter on top. It prefers gardens and arable land, making it mostly synanthropic, but has no bias toward inland or coastal sites. Its preferred soil types are clay, loam, and sandy.

References 

electricus